Keith Allan Johnson (born August 14, 1958) is an American linguist and Professor of Linguistics at the University of California, Berkeley. From 1993 to 2005, he taught in the Department of Linguistics at Ohio State University. He is best known for his works on phonetics with about 20 thousand citations on Google Scholar.

Books
 Peter Ladefoged & Keith Johnson. (2015) A Course in Phonetics, 7th Edition. Cengage.
 Keith Johnson (2011) Acoustic and Auditory Phonetics, 3rd edition.. Wiley-Blackwell
 Keith Johnson (2008) Quantitative Methods in Linguistics. Wiley-Blackwell
 Elizabeth Hume & Keith Johnson (Eds.) (2001) The Role of Speech Perception in Phonology. Academic Press.
 Keith Johnson & John Mullennix (Eds.) Talker Variability in Speech Processing. Academic Press.

References

External links
 Keith Johnson

American phonologists
Living people
Linguists from the United States
Phoneticians
Speech production researchers
Speech perception researchers
Abilene Christian University alumni
University of California, Berkeley faculty
Ohio State University faculty
Ohio State University alumni
1958 births